"Talaash" (Urdu: تلاش, literal English translation: "search") is a song by the Pakistani sufi rock band Junoon. It is the seventh track and the only single released from the band's second album, Talaash (1993), released on EMI Records. Written by guitarist Salman Ahmad, it is the lead single on the album. The song uses blending of rock guitars and bluesy vocals with eastern elements like the use of tablas. It remains one of the band's most popular songs. In addition, the album version of the song featured in the compilation album, Kashmakash, released in 1995.

The song is politically-influenced and became subject to censorship, which led to the eventual ban from all state-run television and radio during the rule of the then Pakistani Prime Minister, Nawaz Sharif.

Music video
The music video is about 5 minutes and 06 seconds long. The video featured all three members, Ali Azmat, Salman Ahmad, and Brian O'Connell. The music video starts off with the band performing the song and focuses on each member of the band at different intervals of time. Coming to the end, the video shows clips of different corrupt things going on in the world and then the video shifts back to the band until the end.

Track listing
Talaash

Personnel

Junoon
Ali Azmat - lead vocals, backing vocals
Salman Ahmad - backing vocals, lead guitar
Brian O'Connell - bass guitar, backing vocals

Additional musicians
Fuad Abbasi - drums
Ustad Ashiq Ali Mir - tablas

References

External links
 Junoon Official Website
 Talaash Official Lyrics

1993 singles
Junoon (band) songs
1992 songs
EMI Records singles
Songs written by Salman Ahmad